Longxi is a county under the administration of the prefecture-level city of Dingxi in the southeast of Gansu Province, China.

Administration
Longxi has twelve towns and five townships. The county seat is Gongchang.

Towns

Towns upgraded to townships
Kezhai
Shuangquan
Quanjiawan

Townships

Climate

Economy
The Longxi economy is mainly based on agriculture, cultivation of ingredients used in Traditional Chinese medicine, and production of aluminium. Astragalus and Codonopsis, among other medicinal plants, are grown and processed for traditional medicine in the Longxi region.

Tourism
 Renshou Mountain Forest Park
 Lijia Long palace
 Baochang building
 Wenfeng tower
 Wenfeng herbal medicine market

External links
Longxi County Government website

References

 
County-level divisions of Gansu
Dingxi